narrow-gauge railways are very similar to  and  gauge. 750 mm gauge rolling stock is almost compatible with 760 and 762 mm railways.

Railways

Gallery

See also 

 List of secondary, industrial and Decauville railways in Argentina
 List of track gauges

References